The 1960 season of the Venezuelan Primera División, the top category of Venezuelan football, was played by 4 teams. The national champions were Deportivo Portugués.

Results

First round

Second round

Tiebreaker play-off

Championship play-off

External links
Venezuela 1960 season at RSSSF

Ven
Venezuelan Primera División seasons
1960 in Venezuelan sport